Fortuynia is a monotypic genus of flowering plants belonging to the family Brassicaceae. It only contains one species, Fortuynia garcinii (Burm.f.) Shuttlew.. 

It is native to Iran, Afghanistan and western Pakistan. 

It is named after Mr. Fortuyne, an unknown person from present-day Jakarta, Indonesia. It was first described and published in Ann. Sci. Nat., Bot., séries 2, Vol.16 on page 379 in 1841.

References

Brassicaceae
Brassicaceae genera
Plants described in 1841
Flora of Iran
Flora of Pakistan
Flora of Afghanistan